The gens Cominia was a minor plebeian family at ancient Rome, which appears in history from the Republic to imperial times. The first of this gens to hold the consulship was Postumus Cominius Auruncus in 501 BC, and from this some scholars have inferred that the Cominii were originally patrician; but all of the later Cominii known to history were plebeians.

Origin
The surname Auruncus, borne by the consul of 501 BC, suggests that the Cominii might have been of Auruncan origin, although if this were so, the family had reached the highest level of Roman society by the beginning of the Republic.  However, there could be other explanations for this cognomen. This early consulship implies that the family was once numbered amongst the patricians, although in the later Republic all of the Cominii seem to have been plebeians. It may be that the family passed over to the plebeians during the fourth or fifth centuries BC, or that the patrician branch of the gens became extinct. Alternatively it has been suggested that the earliest consuls included members of a number of plebeian families, and that plebeians were not formally excluded from the office until the passage of the Twelve Tables in 450–449 BC.  Furthermore, Valerius Maximus suggests that the nomen of Auruncus is uncertain, and that he might instead have belonged to the Postumia gens, although modern historians agree that Postumus was most likely his praenomen.

Praenomina
The Cominii used the praenomina Postumus, Lucius, Sextus, Publius, Gaius, and Quintus. Of these it has been suggested that Postumus is a mistake for the nomen Postumius, but Postumus was an ancient praenomen, and was probably used by the earliest generations of this family.

Branches and cognomina
The first of the family known to history bore the surname Auruncus, suggesting some connection with the Aurunci, a people who lived to the southeast of Latium. Whether the cognomen should be interpreted as meaning that the family migrated from there to Rome under the kings, or whether the consul of 501 BC acquired it as a personal surname is unknown. A member of the family during the time of Augustus bore the surname Pedarius. A variety of personal surnames appears under the Empire.

Members

 Postumus Cominius Auruncus, consul in 501 BC.
 Cominius, a tribune of the plebs, accused one of the military tribunes of attempting to seduce his cornicularius.
 Lucius Cominius, a military tribune in the army of the dictator Lucius Papirius Cursor, in 325 BC.
 Cominius, commander of a troop of cavalry in the army of Tiberius Sempronius Gracchus in Hispania, in 178 BC.
 Sextus Cominius, an eques maltreated by Verres.
 Publius Cominius, a native of Spoletium, was a notable orator and friend of Cicero. He and his brother accused Gaius Cornelius, tribune of 67 BC, who was successfully defended by Cicero.
 Lucius or Gaius Cominius, brother of Publius, in whose accusation of Gaius Cornelius he joined.
 Quintus Cominius, one of Caesar's officers, was captured together with Lucius Ticida by Vergilius, one of Pompeius' commanders, near Thapsus while they were crossing over to Africa in 47 BC.
 Lucius Cominius Pedarius, appointed by Augustus to assist Marcus Valerius Messalla Corvinus in his superintendence of the aqueducts.
 Gaius Cominius, an eques, wrote a libellous poem about the emperor Tiberius, but was pardoned by the emperor at the entreaty of his brother, a senator, in AD 24.
 Gaius Cominius Aufillenus Minicianus.
 Cominius Boëthus Agricola Aurelius Aper.
 Publius Cominius P. f. Clemens.
 Lucius Cominius L. f. Maximus.
 Titus Cominius T. f. Proculus.
 Marcus Cominius Secundus, consul suffectus in AD 151.
 Cominius Suber.
 Lucius Cominius Vipsanius Salutaris.

See also
 List of Roman gentes

References

Bibliography

 Gaius Julius Caesar (attributed), De Bello Africo (On the African War).
 Marcus Tullius Cicero, Brutus, In Verrem, Pro Cluentio.
 Titus Livius (Livy), History of Rome.
 Valerius Maximus, Factorum ac Dictorum Memorabilium (Memorable Facts and Sayings).
 Quintus Asconius Pedianus, Commentarius in Oratio Ciceronis Pro Milone (Commentary on Cicero's Oration Pro Milone).
 Sextus Julius Frontinus, De Aquaeductu (On Aqueducts).
 Publius Cornelius Tacitus, Annales.
 Appianus Alexandrinus (Appian), Hispanica (The Spanish Wars).
 Dictionary of Greek and Roman Biography and Mythology, William Smith, ed., Little, Brown and Company, Boston (1849).
 August Pauly, Georg Wissowa, et alii, Realencyclopädie der Classischen Altertumswissenschaft (Scientific Encyclopedia of the Knowledge of Classical Antiquities, abbreviated RE or PW), J. B. Metzler, Stuttgart (1894–1980).
 Werner Eck, "Die Fasti consulares der Regierungszeit des Antoninus Pius, eine Bestandsaufnahme seit Géza Alföldys Konsulat und Senatorenstand" (The Consular Fasti for the Reign of Antoninus Pius: an Inventory since Géza Alföldy's Konsulat und Senatorenstand), in Studia Epigraphica in Memoriam Géza Alföldy, Werner Eck, Bence Fehér, Péter Kovács, eds., Bonn, pp. 69–90 (2013).

 
Roman gentes